Mekia Valentine (March 6, 1988 – March 26, 2020) was a professional international basketball player. She was recruited by the WNBA and played for the University of California at Santa Barbara Gaucho team.

Sport career 
Valentine was a 6-foot-4 forward. She began playing basketball in high school with Greensoboro Day School before transferring to Dudley High School for her senior year. She was named 3rd-best forward in the nation by Full Court Press. She was named Dudley's MVP and 3A Conference Player of the Year.

She was a top-25 national recruit and earned ACC All-Freshman Honors in 2007 at Wake Forest University.

When she began playing for UCSB's Gauchos team as a junior, she averaged 12.3 points, 9.7 rebounds and 4.0 blocks per game and helped the team make WNIT. The following year, Valentine averaged 11.1 points, 11.2 rebounds and 3.7 blocks. She had many of the school's records, including career rebound average (10.5), blocks in a game (11), blocks in a season (120) and season (.620) and career (.595) field-goal percentage. She was named the Big West's Defensive Player of the Year.

In 2011 she was drafted to the WNBA, by New York Liberty. She chose a four-year career in international basketball, playing in Israel, Poland, Germany, and Romania. In 2016 she retired from basketball and pursued nursing. She worked in patient care before transitioning to the private sector.

Wake Forest and UC Santa Barbara statistics

Source

Personal life 
Valentine was originally from Greensboro, North Carolina. She was the daughter of Lisa Meadows Johnson and Jerome Early Valentine III. Her grandmother, Lillian Manns Valentine, adopted her in infancy and raised her.

References 

1988 births
2020 deaths
African-American basketball players
American women's basketball players
UC Santa Barbara Gauchos women's basketball players
20th-century African-American people
20th-century African-American women
21st-century African-American sportspeople
21st-century African-American women